Liolaemus archeforus, the main tree iguana, is a species of lizard in the family  Liolaemidae. It is native to Argentina.

References

archeforus
Reptiles described in 1971
Reptiles of Argentina
Taxa named by Roberto Donoso-Barros
Taxa named by José Miguel Alfredo María Cei